Coghill is a surname of Scottish origin.  Following is a list of notable people with the surname Coghill:

 Ambrose Coghill (1902-1983), actor and nobleman
 Annie Louisa Walker (1836-1907), English writer who was known in later life by her married name, Anna Louisa Coghill
 Brian Coghill (born 1967), American entrepreneur
 Chris Coghill (born 1975), English actor and screenwriter
 Dawn Coghill, a character in the English soap opera Coronation Street
 Egerton Coghill (1853-1921), Irish baronet and painter
 George Coghill (born 1970), American professional football player
 George E. Coghill (1872–1941), American anatomist
 Several persons named John Coghill, including:
 Jack Coghill (1925–2019), American businessman and politician
 John Coghill (born 1950), American politician, son of Jack Coghill
 Jon Coghill (born 1971), Australian drummer
 Joy Coghill (born 1926), Canadian actress
 Ken Coghill (born 1944), Australian politician
 Marmaduke Coghill (1673-1738), Irish politician
 Nevill Coghill (1899-1980), English literary scholar
 Nevill Coghill (VC) (1852-1879), Irish recipient of the Victoria Cross
 Nikki Coghill (born 1964), Australian actress
 Rhoda Coghill (1903-2000), Irish musician and poet
 Verity Coghill (1986-2019), American writer
 Yvonne Coghill (born 1958), British public servant